Norm Thurston (born October 4 in Ogden, Utah) is an American politician and a Republican member of the Utah House of Representatives representing District 64 since January 1, 2015.

Biography 
Thurston received a BA in Spanish and Agricultural Economic Analysis from Brigham Young University. He then went on to Princeton University where he received both an MS and PhD in Economics. Thurston resides in Provo, Utah with his wife Maria. Together they have three children and three grandchildren. He is currently the Director for the Office of Health Care Statistics which is the agency responsible for collecting, analyzing, and disseminating information about health care cost and quality for the State of Utah.

Political career and elections 
During the 2020 election of district 64, Thurston won with 100% of the vote as all other challengers withdrew.
In a previous election, Thurston defeated William Snider, Ben Summerhalder and Karen Ellingson in the Republican convention and won the November 4, 2014 General election against Democratic nominee Scott Ellis Ferrin and Independent American nominee Jason Christensen with 2,635 votes (67.8%).

During the 2022 General Session, Thurston served on the Social Services Appropriations Subcommittee, House Business and Labor Committee, House Government Operations Committee, Administrative Rules Review Committee, and the Occupational and Professional Licensure Review Committee.

2022 sponsored legislation

References

External links 
 Official page at the Utah State Legislature
 Profile at Project Vote Smart
 Norm Thurston at Ballotpedia
 Norm Thurston Official Website

Year of birth missing (living people)
Living people
Republican Party members of the Utah House of Representatives
Brigham Young University alumni
Princeton University alumni
21st-century American politicians